Simon Iyore Guobadia (born June 2, 1964) is an Nigerian-American entrepreneur, philanthropist, and executive producer.

Early life 
Guobadia was born on June 2, 1964, in Nigeria.

Career 
Guobadia founded SIMCOL Petroleum Limited Company in 2010. SIMCOL is a regional fuel supplier, headquartered in Atlanta, Georgia, specializing in the supply and distribution of Ultra Low Sulfur Diesel (ULSD) and various grades of gasoline products. He has worked alongside Academy Award winner, Spike Lee to executive produce the 2020 film, Son of the South,.

Guobadia opened the Simon's Restaurant in September 2017 in Midtown, Atlanta. Simon's restaurant closed its doors in May 2020 due to the COVID-19 pandemic.

Personal life 
Guobadia is a member of Northpoint Ministries. Guobadia has five children and resides in Atlanta, GA.

On November 25, 2022, Guobadia married Porsha Williams; and was previously married to Falynn Guobadia.

References 

African-American businesspeople
American people of Nigerian descent
Living people
Nigerian emigrants to the United States
People from Atlanta
1964 births